Mabuhay is a Filipino greeting, usually expressed as Mabuhay!, which literally means "long live". The term is also occasionally used for toasts during celebrations to mean "cheers". It is similar to the Hawaiian expression "aloha".

A more modern appropriation of the greeting is its use in the local hospitality industry to welcome guests—a practice rooted in a 1993 campaign launched by restaurateur Rod Ongpauco to more uniquely welcome foreign visitors to the Philippines.

"Mabuhay" is also the name of the inflight magazine published by Philippine Airlines, as well as its frequent-flyer program.

Examples 
 "Mabuhay ang Pilipinas! Mabuhay ang Repúblika!"("Long live the Philippines! Long live the Republic!")
 "Mabuhay ang Pangulo!"("Long live the President!")
 "Mabuhay ang bagong kasál!"("Long live/cheers to the newlyweds!")

Cognates in other languages 
A number of other Philippine languages have terms that are cognate with the term. The Bisayan languages, for example, use the term "Mabuhi" in a manner similar to "Mabuhay".

Viva 
Alternatively, the Spanish equivalent Viva is used in almost exclusively religious contexts, specifically in shouts of praise directed at a patron saint or to God during fiestas and assemblies (e.g., "¡Viva Señor Santo Niño!")

See also
 Merdeka
 Aloha
 Talofa
 Kia Ora
 Tagalog language
 Filipino language

References

Greetings
Tagalog words and phrases
Filipino language